Caspar Richard George Lee (born 24 April 1994) is a British-South African YouTuber turned investor and serial entrepreneur. He was featured in Forbes 30 Under 30 in 2020 for his work in media and advertising.

Career
Lee started his YouTube channel 'dicasp' in 2011, and later renamed it 'Caspar'. Lee was part of the 'YouTube Boyband' that raised money in 2014 for Comic Relief. He was named by Yahoo! News as one of "12 Web-savvy entrepreneurs to watch" in December 2013. He collaborated with Lisa Kudrow in two episodes of Web Therapy (2014).

Lee played Garlic in the 2014 comedy movie, Spud 3: Learning to Fly, with John Cleese and Troye Sivan. Lee and Joe Sugg appeared in a 2015 travel documentary, Joe and Caspar Hit the Road, and its sequel Joe and Caspar Hit The Road: USA, produced for BBC Worldwide. Also in 2016, Lee starred in Laid in America alongside YouTube comedian KSI (Olajide Olatunji). Lee appeared in the music video for Charli XCX's 2017 single, "Boys". 

In August 2017, Lee was named "Chief Visionary Officer" of Influencer Ltd, a British influencer marketing agency. Caspar Lee, a biography written by Lee and his mother, Emily, was published in hardcover in May 2016. Lee also co-founded Margravine Management with Joe Sugg. 

In May 2020, Lee co-founded Proper Living, a South African student accommodation company.

In 2022, Lee launched Creator Ventures with cousin Sasha Kaletsky. Their creator-backed venture capital fund invests globally — mainly on behalf of creators, media stars and other celebrities. Creator Ventures raised $20m to finance early-stage, futuristic startups.

Personal life
Born in London, Lee is the son of TV commercial producers Emily Lee (née Murphy, b. 1956) and Jonathan Lee (b. 1955). Lee's older sister, Theodora Lee (b. 1991), is an author and advertisement creator. The family emigrated to South Africa in 1996. Lee was raised in Knysna and Durban, where he attended Crawford College, La Lucia. When Lee was younger he was diagnosed with Tourette's Syndrome. In 2013, Lee moved from South Africa to live with YouTuber Alfie Deyes. In 2014, Lee moved into a London apartment with fellow YouTuber Joe Sugg. In 2016, he moved into an apartment with Josh Pieters, who is also a YouTuber Lee is engaged to Ambar Driscoll.

Filmography

Film

Television

Web series

Music videos

Awards
Lee won "Social Media Superstar" at the 2018 Global Awards.

References

External links
 
 

1994 births
Living people
English emigrants to South Africa
English male actors
English people of Dutch descent
English people of Irish descent
English video bloggers
English YouTubers
Male bloggers
People from Knysna
People from London
South African male actors
South African people of Dutch descent
South African people of Irish descent
South African video bloggers
South African YouTubers
YouTubers from London
People with Tourette syndrome
South African Internet celebrities
British Internet celebrities